Skenes Creek is a rural locality in Victoria, Australia, situated in the Shire of Colac Otway.

The area was named by surveyor George Smythe after his fellow surveyor A.J. Skene.

References

Towns in Victoria (Australia)